Shiri is a 1999 South Korean action film, written and directed by Kang Je-gyu.

Shiri was the first Hollywood-style big-budget blockbuster to be produced in the new Korean film industry (i.e. after Korea's major economic boom in the late 1990s). Created as a deliberate homage to the "high-octane" action film made popular by Hollywood through the 1980s, it also contained a story that draws on strong Korean national sentiment to fuel its drama. Much of the film's visual style shares that of the Asian action cinema, and particularly Hong Kong action cinema, of John Woo, Tsui Hark, Ringo Lam, and the relentless pace of the second unit directors, like Vic Armstrong and Guy Hamilton, in the James Bond films.

The movie was released under the name Shiri outside of South Korea; in South Korea the title was spelled Swiri. The name refers to Coreoleuciscus splendidus, a fish found in Korean fresh-water streams. At one point in the film protagonist Park Mu-young has a monologue wherein he describes how the waters from both North and South Korea flow freely together, and how the fish can be found in either water without knowing to which it belongs. This ties into the film's ambitions to be the first major-release film to directly address the still-thorny issue of Korean reunification.

Plot

In September 1992, an elite group of North Korean soldiers are put through a brutal training regime. Under the auspices of their commander, Park Mu-young (Choi Min-sik), they will be sent into South Korea as sleeper agents, to be reactivated at some later date. The most promising of the group is Lee Bang-hee, a female sniper who assassinates several key South Korean figures over the next six years.

Over six years later, in September 1998, South Korea is searching for Bang-hee. The agent in charge of her case, Yu Jung-won (Han Suk-kyu) has nightmares about her murdering both him and his partner, Lee Jang-gil (Song Kang-ho). Jung-won is also engaged to a young woman, Lee Myung-hyun (Yunjin Kim), a former alcoholic and the owner of a fish and aquarium supply store. Myung-hyun symbolically gives Jung-won a pair of kissing gourami, a species that cannot live without its mate. Jung-won is worried that he cannot tell her about the real nature of his job due to his security clearance.

Jung-won and Jang-gil are contacted by an arms dealer who claims to have information about their quarry, but he is shot dead by Bang-hee before he can give them any information. After digging a bit deeper, they determine that he had been contacted by the assassin at some point, in the effort to acquire something. That something turns out to be CTX, a binary liquid explosive developed by the South Korean government. In its ground state, CTX is indistinguishable from water, but when placed under the right temperature conditions for long enough, a 200mL worth of CTX has a 1 km blast radius. The agents begin to suspect its intended use by the assassins, when Kim, a scientist working at a lab connected to CTX, is assassinated by Bang-hee.

Mu-young and his agents ambush a military convoy with several liters of CTX, killing all the soldiers and making off with the dangerous liquid before the agents could arrive in time to warn them. Jung-won and Jang-gil suspect a leak, as they are always one step too slow. Bang-hee is ordered to eliminate the 'kissing gourami' obstacle. Jung-won meets with Police Chief Ho to borrow outside forces, but Ho accidentally stands in the path of a bullet fired by Bang-hee's sniper rifle.

Mu-young calls Jung-won and issues an ultimatum: he has concealed several CTX bombs around Seoul, and will give him just enough time to find each one before setting them off. He also mockingly mentions Jung-won's fiancé. It is revealed that Mu-young and Jung-won have a history: Mu-young once hijacked a civilian airliner and killed many civilians, but managed to escape by disguising himself as a wounded member of the flight crew.

The first of the CTX bombs is found on top of a department store, but Mu-young lied about the time factor. The bomb explodes just as the bomb disposal team discovers its exact location, resulting in dozens of deaths. Jung-won takes Myung-hyun to hide out at a hotel, and she begins drinking again.

Jung-won suspects Jang-gil as the leak - who suspects the same thing, as Jung-won has twice survived encounters with Bang-hee he should have died in, and bugged Jung-won's car and phone to see if he could learn anything. Jung-won sets a trap by telling Jang-gil he has new information - which Mu-young and his fellow agents step into - but the situation quickly escalates into a firefight, resulting in police and civilian casualties. Several of the Northern agents are killed, while others escape. When Mu-young is cornered, Bang-hee comes in to save him. Jung-won, having survived his stand-off with Mu-young and Bang-hee, follows a wounded Bang-hee. He loses her, but notices the light to the aquarium turn on and covertly enters, discovering a bleeding Myung-hyun removing her disguise. Jung-won walks away, shocked, and conducts a solo investigation into her history with the real, sick Myung-hyun. Mu-young confronts Bang-hee about her hesitancy and constant failure to kill Jung-won, reminding her of their primary objective.

Mu-young calls NIS, demanding millions as well as a plane for an escape at 2pm in return for the remaining CTX. Myung-hyun's identity is confirmed by the agency later when electronic surveillance devices are discovered in fish decorating the NIS's office, supplied by her. Jang-gil confronts her in her shop, and is shot by Mu-young. Jung-won suddenly appears with officers, who engage in a firefight with Mu-young and his agents. Mu-young and Myung-hyun escape, while a dying Jang-gil hands Myung-hyun's soccer match ticket to Jung-won, set to start at 2pm.

The terrorists aim to detonate a CTX bomb directly over the Royal Box, housing all senior North and South Korean politicians, at a soccer stadium in the midst of an international friendly match played by a North and South Korean team. Jung-won attempts to tell NIS of the ruse and the danger in the stadium but is ignored. He defies orders and rushes to the stadium, where Mu-young, Bang-hee, and other terrorists mingle with the crowd. They find a total ban on all liquids, but enter easily as the CTX and weapons were already planted in the stadium beforehand.

Bang-hee retrieves a hidden Steyr AUG from a restroom cubicle, while Mu-young and his agents tail several patrolling South Korean SWAT officers, who later adjourn to the restrooms. There, the policemen are killed, and their bodies quickly dragged away. Myung-hyun advances into the grandstand with her rifle, while Mu-young and three other men, now disguised as South Korean SWAT officers in uniforms stolen from the dead policemen, enter the stadium control room, killing all but one there and forcing the remaining staff to switch on the stadium lights to trigger the CTX. Jung-won arrives at the stadium and notices the lights. Jung-won goes to the control room to have them shut off, but is taken captive. Sik, a rookie NIS agent, also notices the lights and soon comes in with backup. A violent confrontation in the control room results in the death of all four terrorists, and the lights are switched off in the nick of time. Myung-hyun notices this, and fires at the VIPs, but misses her target. Chasing after the entourage, she kills several more SWAT officers along the way before being confronted by a large group of officers led by Jung-won. As she makes a last-ditch attempt to complete her mission, she is shot dead by Jung-won.

Jung-won later learns that Bang-hee (whom he knew as Myung-hyun) was pregnant with his child, and had left details of the renegade Northern agents' plan and her planned location on his answering machine before leaving for the stadium, but had requested he is not confronted her himself, professing her love for him. Jung-won then visits the real Myung-hyun, who is at a hospital for chemo therapy, and Myung-hyun reminisces about Bang-hee with Jung-won. Myung-hyun lets Jung-won listen to that song, and while listening to it, Jung-won is captivated by the lyrics. The scene then fades, while Jung-won, still listening to the song, shuts his eyes.

Cast 
 Han Suk-kyu as Yu Jung-won, a South Korean secret agent who engaged with Bang-hee while disguised as Myung-hyun
 Choi Min-sik as Park Mu-young, a North Korean, a leader for the terrorists who has feelings for Bang-hee
 Song Kang-ho as Lee Jang-gil, also a South Korean secret agent and Yu Jong-won's partner
 Yunjin Kim as Lee Myung-hyun / Lee Bang-hee, a North Korean spy
 Yoon Joo-sang as the chief agent
 Park Yong-woo as Sik, a secret agent
 Johnny Kim as Jung Dae-ho (credited as Derek Kim)
 Lee Seung-shin as a physician
 Kim Su-ro as a North Korean terrorist
 Jang Hyun-sung as special investigation team member (cameo)
 Hwang Jung-min as special investigation team member (cameo)

Box office 
Part of the funding was covered by the Korean electronics giant Samsung. The film was a critical and financial success in South Korea and broke box office records. Shiri was seen in South Korean cinemas by 6.9 million people, beating the previous record set by Titanic of 4.3 million.

It was also successful throughout the rest of Asia (it was a top-grossing film when released in Hong Kong), and has since been issued on video worldwide. It has also played theatrically in limited engagements in the West.

Reception
The film was voted the favorite film by South Koreans with 11,918 votes in a 2002 online poll of 54,013 people conducted by the South Korean movie channel Orion Cinema Network.

In 2014, Time Out polled several film critics, directors, actors and stunt actors to list their top action films. Shiri was listed at 96th place on this list.

Legacy 
The film would later serve as the basis for the television series Iris, starring Lee Byung-hun and Kim Tae-hee.

See also 
 Iris (TV series)

References

Bibliography

External links 
 
 
 
 
 Shiri review at Koreanfilm.org

1999 films
1999 action thriller films
South Korean action thriller films
1990s spy action films
South Korean spy action films
Films about terrorism in Asia
Films set in 1998
Films set in Seoul
Films set in Jeju
Films shot in Seoul
Films shot in Jeju
Films directed by Kang Je-gyu
1990s Korean-language films
Films about North Korea–South Korea relations
North Korea in fiction